Tal Ilan (born 1956) is an Israeli-born historian, notably of women's history in Judaism, and lexicographer. She is known for her work in rabbinic literature, the history of ancient Judaism, the Dead Sea Scrolls, ancient Jewish historiography, Jewish epigraphy, archaeology and papyrology, onomastics, and ancient Jewish magic. She is the initiator and director of The Feminist Commentary on the Babylonian Talmud (FCBT). She received her education from the Hebrew University of Jerusalem. She is currently  professor of Jewish Studies at the Free University of Berlin.

Early life and education 
Tal Ilan was born on January 24, 1956, on Kibbutz Lahav in the Negev desert. She did her PhD at the Hebrew University of Jerusalem. Her thesis was Jewish Women in Palestine during the Hellenistic Roman Period (332 BCE-200CE).

Career 
Following her thesis, Ilan taught in the Department of the History of the Jewish People at the University of Jerusalem. She became a professor of Jewish studies at the Freie University in Berlin in 2003. She has lectured and had fellowships at the University of Frankfurt, the University of Oldenburg, Harvard, Yale, the Jewish Theological Seminary, the Schechter Institute, Ben Gurion University, Trinity College, Oxford, and Leo Baeck College.

Tal Ilan examines gender issues in the Bible, Hellenistic literature, and Rabbinic literature in four of her works: her PhD project, Women in the Second Temple Literature, Mine and Yours And Hers, and Integrating Women. She uses feminist theory to interpret these texts, and pays attention to language, text, and textual tradition to inform her work. These ideas have been furthered in Feminist Commentary on the Babylonian Talmud. 

Ilan's work, Lexicon of Jewish Names in Late Antiquity: 330 BCE-650 CE contains 4 volumes. They state all the recorded names associated with Jews in late antiquity, and explores their etymology, distribution, and potential to inform scholars about Jewish life during this time.

Ilan's work, A Collection of Texts on Jews and Judaism on Perishable Material from Egypt: 330 BCE-700 CE, written in collaboration with Noah Hacham, corrects, updates, and publishes evidence of Jews in Egypt from the Hellenistic period to the Arab conquest. The materials Ilan has been working with in this project have been papyrus, ostraca, and parchment.

Ilan's work " A Digital Synopsis of the Mishnah and Tosefta", in collaboration with Hayim Lapin, is a digital research tool that uses computerized and manual text analysis to evaluate the relationship between the Mishnah and the Tosefta. This project is funded by the NEH/DFG Bilateral Digital Humanities Program.

Ilan can be seen in various TV and movie documentaries as an expert in Jewish history. These include Mary Magdalene: Saint or Sinner (2008), Secrets of the Jesus Tomb (2008), The Lost Tomb of Jesus (2007), and Bible Mysteries (2004).

Personal life 
Tal Ilan speaks Hebrew, English, and German fluently. She is married and has two sons. She describes herself as a secular Jew and an atheist.

Works

Books 
 Women in Greco-Roman Palestine (1995; repr., Peabody, Mass.: Hendrickson, 1996)
Mine and Yours are Hers: Retrieving Women's History from Rabbinic Literature, Arbeiten zur Geschichte des Antiken Judaismus
Integrating Women into Second Temple History (1999)
Silencing the Queen (2006)
Massekehet Taanit (Feminist Commentary on the Babylonian Talmud. 2008)
Lexicon of Jewish Names in Late Antiquity: 330 BCE - 650 CE (4 vols. 2002-2012)
The New Jewish Inscriptions from Hierapolis and the Question of Jewish Diaspora Cemeteries Scripta classica Israelica: 25-28 Israel Society for the Promotion of Classical Studies (2006)
Josephus and the Rabbis (2017)
Mishnah Yevamot (unpublished)

Selected essays 

 “A Pattern of Historical Errors in the Writings of Josephus,” Zion 51 (1986) 357-60 (Hebrew)
 “Julia Crispina Daughter of Berenicianus, A Herodian Princess in the Babatha Archive: A Case Study in Historical Identification,” The Jewish Quarterly Review 82 (1991-2) 361-81. Reprinted in Integrating Women, pp. 217–33.
 “‘Men Born of Woman ...’ (Job 14:1): The Phenomenon of Men Bearing Metronymes at the Time of Jesus,” Novum Testamentum 34 (1992) 23-45.
 “Biblical Women’s Names in the Apocryphal Tradition,” Journal for the Study of the Pseudepigrapha 11 (1993) 3-67.
 “Jewish Studies and Women Studies: Where and When do they Meet?” Jewish Studies Quarterly 3 (1996) 162-73.
 "Names of the Hasmoneans,” The Jewish Quarterly Review 78 (1987) 1-20.
 “In the Footsteps of Jesus: Jewish Women in a Jewish Movement,” in Transformative Encounters: Jesus and Women Re-Viewed, ed. Ingrid Rosa Kitzberg (Leiden: Brill, 1999) 115-36.
 “The New Jewish Inscriptions from Hierapolis and the Question of Jewish Diaspora Cemeteries,” Scripta Classica Israelica 25 (2006) 71-86.

Selected articles 

 “Names and Naming,” Encyclopedia of the Dead Sea Scrolls  ( New York: Oxford University Press; 2000) 596-600. 
 “Shelamzion Alexandra,” Encyclopedia of the Dead Sea Scrolls (New York: Oxford University Press; 2000) 872-4.
 “Joseph und Aseneth,” Religion in Geschichte und Gegenwart 4 (Tübingen: J.C.B. Mohr, 2001) 577.

References

External links
 Freie Universität Berlin profile page

1956 births
Living people
Academic staff of the Free University of Berlin
Gender studies academics
Hebrew University of Jerusalem alumni
Israeli feminists
Israeli lexicographers
Jewish atheists
Jewish feminists
Jewish writers
Judaic scholars
Feminist historians